Make Up City is the fourth album and the third studio album by Casiopea released on November 21, 1980.

Track listing 
All Arranged by Issei Noro,
except "Reflections Of You" by Minoru Mukaiya & Issei Noro.

Personnel 
CASIOPEA are
Issei Noro - Guitar (YAMAHA SG-2000 & SG-1000 Fretless, Acoustic guitar)
Minoru Mukaiya - Keyboards (Fender Rhodes 73, Acoustic Piano, Prophet-5, Mini Moog, YAMAHA SK-20 & CS-30, KORG 800DV, Roland VP-330)
Tetsuo Sakurai - Bass (YAMAHA BB-2000 & BB-2000 Fretless, Fender Jazz Bass, Kramer DMZ-6000B)
Akira Jimbo - Drums (YAMAHA YD-9000R)
 Hideki Matsutake - Synthesizer manipulator

Production 
 Executive Producer - Syoro Kawazoe
 Producer - Shunsuke Miyazumi
 Engineer - Norio Yoshizawa
 Assistant Engineers - Atsushi Saito
Recorded at Studio "A", Shibaura, Tokyo Japan from July 7 to September 16, 1980 with 3M 32 track digital recorder.
 Illustrator - Kazuyuki Takimoto
 Design - Hidetake Awano
 Cover Coordination - Toshinao Tsukui
Liner notes - Jun Takemura
Remastering engineer - Kouji Suzuki (2016)

Charts

Release history

External links

References 

1980 albums
Casiopea albums
Alfa Records albums